Alabanda is a Polish nobility coat of arms, used by several szlachta families in the times of the Kingdom of Poland.

History

According to a legend the Alabanda coat of arms comes from the times of the Piast dynasty in the 12th century. It was first mentioned in records in 1278 and no longer used after the 16th century.

Blazon
Escutcheon: Sable (or Azure) a horse head Argent issuant from a crescent of the same.
Crest: Three (or five) ostrich feathers.

Notable bearers
Notable bearers of this coat of arms include:
 Stefan de Kobylagłowa 
 Strzeżywoj de Kobylagłowa
 Jan Frezer, burgrave of Kraków, secretary of the Tarnogród Confederation

Gallery

See also
 Polish heraldry
 Heraldic family
 List of Polish nobility coats of arms

Bibliography
 Tadeusz Gajl: Herbarz polski od średniowiecza do XX wieku : ponad 4500 herbów szlacheckich 37 tysięcy nazwisk 55 tysięcy rodów. L&L, 2007. .
 Franciszek Piekosiński: Heraldyka polska wieków średnich, Kraków, 1899, s.196
 Juliusz Karol Ostrowski: Księga herbowa rodów polskich, Warszawa, 1897, T.1, s.10
 Franciszek Piekosiński, Pieczęcie polskie str. 123
 Józef Szymański: Herbarz rycerstwa polskiego z XVI wieku. Warszawa: DiG, 2001, s. 19. .

References

External links
 http://pl.wikisource.org/wiki/Encyklopedia_staropolska/Alabanda

Alabanda